The Empire Mall is a shopping mall in Sioux Falls, South Dakota, United States. The anchor stores are Macy's, Dick's Sporting Goods, and JCPenney. There are 2 vacant anchor stores that were once Younkers and Sears. As of August 2018, the mall was owned by Simon Property Group.

History

Originally developed in 1974-75 by Des Moines-based General Growth Development Corp., it opened as the Sioux Empire Plaza. It was sold to the IBM Pension Fund in 1985 while General Growth continued to manage the property. In 1998, it was acquired by a joint venture of The Macerich Company and Simon Property Group, with Macerich assuming the role of managing partner. In 2012, Simon Property Group became the sole owner of the mall.  In 2018, Simon Property Group, owner of the mall, posted a document about plans for the mall after losing two tenants.

In 1978 the mall underwent its first major expansion, with the addition of Dayton's (later Marshall Field's, now Macy's) and 22 other specialty stores.

On April 18, 2018, it was announced that Younkers would be closing as parent company The Bon-Ton Stores was going out of business. The store closed on August 29, 2018.

On May 31, 2018, Sears announced that its store would also be closing as part of a plan to close 78 stores nationwide. The store closed in September 2018. The vacant Sears store was occupied by a temporary Camping World store from November 2018 to April 2019.

On December 3, 2018, Dillard's announced it would open a store in the vacant Younkers anchor store space.  of space would be added on to the existing  of the former Younkers space. Dillards planned to open in late 2019. However by late 2019, there had been no updates on the Dillard’s site.

As of July 2017, it has been managed by Dan Giles who replaced Ron Soucie. In 2016, Ron Soucie replaced Dennis Gilliam.

On August 2, 2022, it was announced that Dillard's will open in the fall of 2023.

References

Shopping malls in South Dakota
Simon Property Group
Economy of Sioux Falls, South Dakota
Buildings and structures in Sioux Falls, South Dakota
Tourist attractions in Sioux Falls, South Dakota
Shopping malls established in 1975